Ilka Minor (born 30 April 1975 in Klagenfurt) is a rallying co-driver from Austria.

Rally career
Minor debuted WRC at the 1997 Tour de Corse. She has partnered several experienced rally drivers throughout her career, including Manfred Stohl, Henning Solberg and  Evgeny Novikov. In 2011, she was awarded the Michael Park Trophy, an award given annually in memory of the late co-driver Michael Park. Currently, she is the navigator of Eyvind Brynildsen in the WRC-2 class.

Results

WRC results

* Season still in progress.

References

External links

 
 Ilka Minor's e-wrc profile

1975 births
Living people
Austrian rally co-drivers
Female rally drivers
Sportspeople from Klagenfurt
World Rally Championship co-drivers